Andreas "Annan" Knudsen (23 November 1887 – 11 February 1982) was a Norwegian sailor and rower.

Knudsen competed in the 1908 Summer Olympics with the men's eight in rowing where they were eliminated in round one. At the 1920 Summer Olympics, he was a crew member of the Norwegian boat Marmi which won the silver medal in the 6 metre class (1907 rating).

References

External links
profile

1887 births
1982 deaths
Norwegian male sailors (sport)
Rowers at the 1908 Summer Olympics
Sailors at the 1920 Summer Olympics – 6 Metre
Olympic sailors of Norway
Olympic silver medalists for Norway
Olympic medalists in sailing

Medalists at the 1920 Summer Olympics
Sportspeople from Drammen